Tony Harn is an English musician. A multi-instrumentalist; predominantly guitar but also bass guitar, synthesizers, organ, percussion, programming and is active within the north-west English progressive rock and avant-garde music scenes.

Harn's music features elements of rock, jazz, post-punk and experimental noise. He has released five solo instrumental albums, more recently moving towards loop music stylings. As well as maintaining a solo career, he is a member of Nerve Toy Trio and has previously been a member of Resindust, Lifebox and Spacematic. He is an active collaborator with other musicians, most notably with Tim Bowness of No-Man.

Career
Tony Harn began his musical career as the instrumental half of the Warrington duo Spacematic in the mid-1990s. Following that project's split, he began working on solo material, playing or programming all of the instruments himself. Harn released his debut instrumental album From the Inside in 1997, on his own home label.<ref>[http://www.arlequins.it/pagine/articoli/alfa/corpo.asp?iniz=H&fine=I&ch=1054 Review of Tony Harn’s From the Inside album by Alberto Nucci in Arlequins', 1998 (in Italian)]</ref> This was followed by a second album, Lifebox in 1999. During this period Harn also recorded material with a fellow Warringtonian musician, Tim Bowness of No-Man, leading to an appearance and co-write on the Tim Bowness/Samuel Smiles album World of Bright Futures in 1999.

In 2000, Harn formed a short-lived trio called Lifebox in which he played guitar alongside David Jones (bass guitar, ex-Plenty) and Howard Jones (ex-After The Stranger and a contributor to the debut album by Porcupine Tree). Lifebox played new material as well as music from Harn's solo records. The band split up after releasing one EP, Charismatic Couch.Listed review of Lifebox’s Charismatic Couch EP by Paul Hightower in Expose magazine issue 22 (page 64) See also 

Returning to solo work, Harn released his third album Moving Moons in 2001  and engaged in work with the Warrington experimental music scene via bands such as Psychiatric Challenge. He subsequently teamed up with Lewis Gill (Psychiatric Challenge, Vivahead) to form the experimental duo Resindust, who released one eponymous album in 2002. Harn's fourth solo album, Revealed in Black and White was released in 2005.

Harn's next album did not appear for another three years, when he released Loops in 2008.Review of Tony Harn's Loops album by Jim Corcoran in Dutch Progressive Rock Pages, 2008 volume 24 As the title suggested, it displayed a shift in his working methods towards further improvisation and loop music.

Harn is currently a member of Nerve Toy Trio, which also features his former Lifebox bandmate David Jones on bass guitar and drummer Henry Rogers (Touchstone, Sort Code, Final Conflict, DeeExpus). In 2011, the band released their debut EP The Hard Cell, which gained them reviews in Classic Rock Presents Prog and Jazzwise.Review of Nerve Toy Trio The Hard Cell EP in Jazzwise,  August/September 2011 In the same year the band performed at Blackpool's Electric Garden Progressive Rock festival. In 2012, Nerve Toy Trio contributed the track "The Riddle Of Anything" to the cover-mount CD of Prog magazine issue 27.

Discography
SoloFrom the Inside (1997, self-released)Lifebox (1999, self-released)Moving Moons (2001, self-released, distributed by Burning Shed)Revealed in Black and White (2005, self-released, distributed by Burning Shed)Loops (2008, self-released, distributed by Burning Shed)

with Lifebox
 Charismatic Couch EP (2000, self-released)

with ResindustResindust (2002, self-released)

with Nerve Toy TrioThe Hard Cell EP (2011, self-released, distributed by Burning Shed)

 Guest appearances 
Tim Bowness/Samuel Smiles: World of Bright Futures 1999, Hidden Art) (co-write/guitars/bass guitar/organ on 'Red Eye Removal')''

References

External links
 Tony Harn @ MySpace
 Tony Harn @ Burning Shed

Living people
Progressive rock guitarists
English rock guitarists
English jazz guitarists
English male guitarists
English bass guitarists
Male bass guitarists
English keyboardists
English multi-instrumentalists
English experimental musicians
People from Warrington
Musicians from Cheshire
British male jazz musicians
Year of birth missing (living people)